The Type 89 15 cm cannon was the main gun of the Imperial Japanese Army's heavy artillery units. The Type 89 designation was given to this gun as it was accepted in the year 2589 of the Japanese calendar (1929). It was widely used from the Manchurian Incident to the end of World War II, for example, Nomonhan, Bataan and Corregidor Island, Okinawa. The Type 89 15 cm gun was comparable to the U.S. M1918 155 mm GPF cannon, but the Type 89 had shorter range.  The Type 89 was less efficient than similar heavy-caliber guns of other nations in World War II.

Design
The trail was the split-box type trail with detachable spades and a split-trail gun cariage. The traversing hand wheel and the scale were located on the left side of the carriage. The elevation scale, the range drum, and the sight were on the right side of the carriage. When being moved, the cannon barrel and cariage are each drawn by a 8-ton tractor.

It fired a shell considerably heavier than that used in the 150 mm howitzer. The Japanese were sufficiently satisfied with this gun to provide it with a fixed mount for siege use in 1930, but as a heavy field piece it had certain definite limitations. Traveling in two loads, it took longer to emplace than weapons of corresponding caliber in other modern armies and yet it was outranged by all of them.

The Type 89 had a variable hydro-pneumatic recoil system and an interrupted thread breech block; the latter had a mushroom head and stepped-up buttress-type screws. Two carriages have been recovered. The only apparent difference is in the two equilibrators. One has spring type and the other hydro-spring type. The trail is the split box type with detachable trail spades. The traversing handwheel and scale are located on the left side of the carriage; the scale is graduated up to 350 mils in ten-mil increments. The elevation scale, range drum, and sight are on the right side of the carriage; the range scale is graduated up to 42 degrees.

An eight-ton prime mover was used to tow the piece. For traveling, the gun was broken down in two loads, tube and carriage.

Combat record
The Type 89 saw service during the Nomonhan Incident. No example of this weapon was captured before 1944, although it was probably used in the Malay and Philippine campaigns.

References

Notes

Bibliography
 War Department Special Series No 25 Japanese Field Artillery October 1944

External links

 "150 mm Gun Type 89" Japanese Artillery Weapons, CINCPAC Bulletin 152, July 1945.

8
Artillery of Japan
150 mm artillery
Military equipment introduced in the 1920s